Ashok Mathur is a South Asian (Indo-Canadian) cultural organizer, writer and visual artist. Prior to this he was the head of Creative Studies and a professor in the Department of Creative Studies at the University of British Columbia, Okanagan campus. As a Canada Research Chair in Cultural and Artistic Inquiry, he also directed the Centre for Innovation in Culture and the Arts in Canada (CiCAC).

Early life and education 
Mathur was born in Bhopal, India; in 1962, at the age of one, he emigrated with his family to Canada. He worked as a journalist from 1981 to 1985, and then completed his studies at the University of Calgary, earning a bachelor's degree, master of arts, and Ph.D. Prior to joining Thompson Rivers in 2005, he taught at the Emily Carr Institute of Art and Design.

Works 
Mathur is the author of a volume of poetic prose (Loveruage; a dance in three parts, Wolsak and Wynn, 1994), a long poem ("The First White Black Man", monograph press, 2017) and three novels:
 Once Upon an Elephant (Arsenal Pulp Press, 1998) recounts the story of the birth of Ganesh as a Canadian courtroom drama.
The Short, Happy Life of Harry Kumar (Arsenal Pulp Press, 2002) was nominated for the Commonwealth Writers' Prize, and blends the Ramayana with modern Canada.
A Little Distillery in Nowgong (Arsenal Pulp Press, 2009) follows three generations of a Parsi family from India to North America. Along with the novel, Mathur also produced an associated art installation, which was shown in Vancouver, Ottawa, and Kamloops.
Additionally, Mathur's artwork "one hundred thirty-three thousand five hundred twenty-eight words and a super-8 grab" was part of a 2009 acquisition by the Canada Council Art Bank.

References

External links
Centre for Innovation in Culture and the Arts in Canada
Ashok Mathur's blog

Living people
Academic staff of Thompson Rivers University
Canadian male novelists
University of Calgary alumni
Indian emigrants to Canada
Writers from Bhopal
Canada Research Chairs
1961 births
Canadian journalists
Canadian male non-fiction writers